The 2010–11 WRU Challenge Cup, known for sponsorship reasons as the SWALEC Cup, is the 41st WRU Challenge Cup, the annual national rugby union cup competition of Wales. The competition was won by Pontypridd who beat Aberavon 35 – 24 in the final.

Calendar

Matches

Round 1

Round 2

Round 3

Finals

Quarter-finals

Semi-finals

Final

Top Half

Bottom Half

See also
WRU Challenge Cup
2010–11 WRU Challenge Cup: Tier 2
2010–11 WRU Challenge Cup: Tier 3

Challenge Cup
WRU Challenge Cup
Wales CUp